The 2014 Arizona gubernatorial election was held on November 4, 2014, to elect the Governor of Arizona, concurrently with elections to the United States Senate in other states and elections to the United States House of Representatives and various state and local elections.

Incumbent Republican Governor Jan Brewer was term-limited and could not run for re-election to a second consecutive full term in office. After a bitter six-candidate primary, Republicans nominated Arizona State Treasurer Doug Ducey; Democrat Fred DuVal, the former chairman of the Arizona Board of Regents, won his party's nomination unopposed. Ducey won the election with 53% of the vote. This election marked the first time since 1994 that no female gubernatorial candidate was on the ballot and that a man was elected governor of Arizona. This was the first open seat gubernatorial election in the state since 2002.

Background

Democratic Governor Janet Napolitano resigned on January 21, 2009, to be sworn in as Secretary of the Department of Homeland Security. Since Arizona does not have a lieutenant governor, Secretary of State Jan Brewer was first in the state's gubernatorial line of succession and was sworn in as governor on the same day. She was elected to a full term in 2010, defeating Democrat Terry Goddard, the Arizona Attorney General, by 54% to 42%.

Brewer was term-limited in 2014, despite only serving one full term. This is because Arizona state law limits office holders to two consecutive terms regardless of whether they serve full or partial terms. In November 2012, Brewer declared she was looking into what she called "ambiguity" in Arizona's term-limit law to seek a third term. In February 2014, Brewer reiterated that she was considering running for re-election, but on March 12, 2014, she announced that she would not attempt to seek another term in office, which would have required what The Arizona Republic called a "long-shot court challenge".

Republican primary
The Republican primary campaign was widely characterised as being "bitter" and "nasty" and the $16.2 million spent by the six Republican candidates means that the 2014 election has already broken the record for most expensive gubernatorial race in state history, exceeding the  2002 election in which $9.2 million was spent during the primary and general election campaigns combined.

Candidates

Declared
 Ken Bennett, Secretary of State of Arizona
 Doug Ducey, State Treasurer of Arizona
 Christine Jones, former executive vice president, General Counsel and corporate secretary for Go Daddy
 Frank Riggs, former U.S. Representative from California and candidate for the U.S. Senate from California in 1998
 Scott Smith, Mayor of Mesa
 Andrew Thomas, former County attorney of Maricopa County, disbarred lawyer, and candidate for Arizona Attorney General in 2010

Withdrew
 Hugh Hallman, former mayor of Tempe (ran for state treasurer and lost)
 Al Melvin, state senator
 John Molina, OB/GYN and former CEO of Phoenix Indian Medical Center

Declined
 Joe Arpaio, Sheriff of Maricopa County
 Jan Brewer, incumbent Governor
 Brenda Burns, Corporation Commissioner
 Wil Cardon, businessman and candidate for the U.S. Senate in 2012 (ran for Secretary of State and lost)
 Tom Horne, Attorney General of Arizona (ran for re-election and lost)
 Martha McSally, retired United States Air Force colonel and nominee for Arizona's 2nd congressional district in 2012 (ran for AZ-02 and won)
 Steve Pierce, state senator
 Steven Seagal, actor and reserve deputy sheriff

Endorsements

Polling

Results

Democratic primary

Candidates

Declared
 Fred DuVal, former chairman of the Arizona Board of Regents

Withdrew
 Ronald Cavanaugh, Libertarian candidate for governor in 2010

Declined
 Chad Campbell, Minority Leader of the Arizona House of Representatives
 Richard Carmona, former Surgeon General and nominee for the U.S. Senate in 2012
 Neil Giuliano, former mayor of Tempe
 Terry Goddard, former Arizona Attorney General, candidate for governor in 1994 and nominee for governor in 1990 and 2010 (ran for Secretary of State and lost)
 Marco A. López Jr., former chief of staff for the U.S. Customs and Border Protection and former mayor of Nogales
 Janet Napolitano, president of the University of California, former secretary of the Department of Homeland Security and former governor of Arizona
 Felecia Rotellini, attorney and nominee for Arizona Attorney General in 2010 (ran for Attorney General and lost)
 Greg Stanton, Mayor of Phoenix

Endorsements

Polling

Results

Third parties

Candidates

Declared
 Brian Bailey (independent write-in candidate), Arizona Army National Guardsman
 Cary Dolego (independent), write-in candidate for governor in 2010
 Barry Hess (Libertarian Party), perennial candidate
 Joseph James "J." Johnson (unaffiliated write-in candidate), food account manager and brother of Eddie Johnson
 John Lewis Mealer (Americans Elect), candidate for the Americans Elect nomination for president in 2012
 Alice Novoa (Republican write-in candidate)
 Diana-Elizabeth Ramseys Rasmussen Kennedy (Independent write-in candidate)
 Curtis Woolsey (unaffiliated write-in candidate)

Results

General election

Debates
 Complete video of debate, September 10, 2014 – C-SPAN
 Complete video of debate, September 29, 2014 – C-SPAN

Predictions

Polling

With Bennett

With Jones

With Melvin

With Molina

With Riggs

With Smith

With Thomas

Results

References

External links
 Arizona gubernatorial election, 2014 at Ballotpedia

Official campaign websites
 Doug Ducey for Governor (Archived)
 Fred DuVal for Governor (Archived)

Gubernatorial
2014
2014 United States gubernatorial elections